The 7th Guards Brigade, also known by their nickname Pumas, was a Croatian Ground Army (HV) brigade formed on 23 December 1992 in Varaždin. The brigade was initially formed out of the 5th Battalion of the 1st "Tigers" Brigade and its first commander was Ivan Korade, who led the unit during the War of Independence (1991–95).

The 7th Brigade was disbanded in 2003 when it merged with the 2nd "Thunders" Brigade. In March 2008 the 2nd Brigade was also disbanded. Members of the former 7th Brigade who had served in the 2nd Brigade 2003–08 were then incorporated into the present-day Armoured Guards Brigade (Gardijska oklopno-mehanizirana brigada or GOMBR) and formed a battalion which uses the original 7th Brigade's nickname and emblem.

Commanders
Ivan Korade (1992–1996)
Željko Dvekar (1996–1999)
Marijan Kretić (1999)
Branko Predragović (1999–2002)
Marijan Kretić (2002–2003)

See also
Croatian National Guard

References

External links
History of the 7th Brigade 

Military units and formations established in 1992
Military units and formations disestablished in 2003
Brigades of Croatia
Military units and formations of the Croatian War of Independence